Rainer Aigner (born 4 September 1967) is a German former footballer.

References

External links

1967 births
Living people
German footballers
TSV 1860 Munich players
FC Bayern Munich II players
FC Bayern Munich footballers
Fortuna Düsseldorf players
Bundesliga players
2. Bundesliga players
Association football defenders
20th-century German people